Naw Wathu, also termed as Nawathoo or Nowathoo, is a village in Anantnag tehsil in Anantnag district in the Indian union territory of Jammu and Kashmir. It is one of 105 villages in Anantnag block along with villages like Monghall, Lali Pora, Mala Pora and Furrah.

It is a small village. Naw Wathu is divided into two parts.

Demographics
The total population was 412 at the 2011 Indian census, comprising 214 males and 198 females in 65 households.

Kashmiri is the main local language.  People also speak Urdu and Hindi.

References 

Villages in Anantnag district